Vigur is the second largest island of the Ísafjarðardjúp fjord in Westfjords, Iceland. The island is most noted for its thriving seabird colonies—particularly Atlantic puffins—traditional eiderdown production and historical buildings. 

The two story Viktoriuhús, built in 1860, is one of the oldest timber buildings in Iceland and is part of The Historical Buildings Collection of Þjóðminjasafn Íslands. Iceland's oldest seaworthy boat, Vigurbreiður, is also on Vigur.

Today, there is only a single farm located on Vigur. In the seventeenth century the farm on Vigur was home to Magnús Jónsson, a wealthy man who collected and commissioned manuscripts. The first reference to Vigur in the written record is 1194 but it may well be referenced earlier than that under a different name.

It is the only surviving historic windmill in the country and possibly the northernmost windmill in the world.

Each year around 3500 nests of the Common Eider are found on Vigur. The nests are lined with Eider Down which is collected by the farmer once eggs have hatched and chicks vacated. The Eider Down is dried, sorted and cleaned by hand using methods passed down through generations. 

Vigur is home to one of the largest puffin colonies in Iceland as well as a rare colony of circa 1000 Black Guillemots. It also hosts vast numbers of Arctic Tern (880 breeding pairs) and other Arctic seabirds.

References

External links
 Official website

Islands of Iceland